Shahrdari Langarud Football Club is an Iranian football club based in Langarud, Iran. In 2014 Despite Remaining in Second Division, Sepidrood bought Shahrdari's licence therefore Shahrdari will compote in Third Division.

Season Records

Second Division
 2003–04: 5th/ North Group
 2004–05: 1st/ Group 1/ Promoted

Azadegan League
 2005–06: 12th/Group B/ Relegated

Second Division
 2009–10: 4th/ Group B
 2010–11: 16th/ Group A/ Relegated

Third Division
 2011–12: 2nd/ Group 2/ Promoted

Second Division
 2012–13: 9th/ Group A
 2013–14: 10th/ Group A/ Relegated

See also
 Hazfi Cup

Football clubs in Iran
Association football clubs established in 2001
2001 establishments in Iran